"Take Me Back to Chicago", originally released on the Chicago XI album, was a 1978 chart hit in the U.S. and Canada for the band Chicago. The song features Chaka Khan on backing vocals.

Released as a single in May 1978, the song reached No. 63 on the Billboard Hot 100 and No. 62 on the Cash Box Top 100 in the United States. In Canada, it peaked at No. 66. On the adult contemporary charts, it reached No. 39 in the U.S. and No. 21 in Canada.

References

External links
 Lyrics of "Take Me Back to Chicago"
 

1977 songs
1978 singles
Chicago (band) songs
Songs written by Danny Seraphine
Songs written by Hawk Wolinski
Song recordings produced by James William Guercio
Columbia Records singles